Old Monarch Pass (elevation ) is a mountain pass on the border of Gunnison and Chaffee counties of west-central Colorado. Old Monarch Pass divides the watersheds of Porphyry Creek, a tributary of Tomichi Creek and the Gunnison River, to the west and the South Arkansas River to the east. The name ‘‘Monarch’’ comes from nearby Monarch Ridge and the community of Monarch.

History
A road crossing the Original Monarch Pass was constructed 1880 and served as an important wagon and stage road connecting the town of South Arkansas (later named Salida) on the east side to mining camps and the city of Gunnison on the west side. In 1922, the road was improved and rerouted to better accommodate motor vehicles. The new road crossed the divide at a lower saddle  to the southeast. This second Monarch Pass is what is now known as Old Monarch Pass. It remained an important unpaved crossing of the divide until 1939 when another highway realignment moved the crossing yet further southeast  to the third and current Monarch Pass where U. S. Route 50 crosses today.

Today Old Monarch Pass is traversed by Forest Road 237, a gravel road open to vehicular traffic during the summer months. During the winter, the road is not plowed but the pass can be reached by skiers and snowmobilers.

References

External links
Monarch Pass - Old, passbagger.org

Mountain passes of Colorado
Landforms of Gunnison County, Colorado
Landforms of Chaffee County, Colorado
Great Divide of North America
Transportation in Chaffee County, Colorado
Transportation in Gunnison County, Colorado